Veeragunnamapuram also called Rajapuram is a village in Srikakulam district of the Indian state of Andhra Pradesh. It is located in Mandasa mandal.

Etymology
The name Veeragunnamapuram is derived from  Veera Gunamma a Famous freedom fighter from this village.she donated her property to farmers

Demographics
Veeragunnamapuram village has population of 1022 of which 570 are males while 452 are females as per Population 2011, Indian Census.

References

Villages in Srikakulam district